Brachynomadini is a tribe of cuckoo bees in the family Apidae. There are at least 5 genera and 20 described species in Brachynomadini.

Genera
These five genera belong to the tribe Brachynomadini:
 Brachynomada Holmberg, 1886 i c g b
 Kelita Sandhouse, 1943 i c g
 Paranomada Linsley & Michener, 1937 i c g b
 Trichonomada Michener, 1996 g
 Triopasites Linsley, 1939 i c g b
Data sources: i = ITIS, c = Catalogue of Life, g = GBIF, b = Bugguide.net

References

Further reading

External links

 

Nomadinae
Articles created by Qbugbot